The Mighty Sky is the Grammy-nominated tenth studio album by Beth Nielsen Chapman.  It was released in the United States on October 9, 2012.

Track listing
All tracks composed by Beth Nielsen Chapman, Annie Roboff and Rocky Alvey
"The Mighty Sky” (Chapman, Alvey) – 3:47
"Through Hubble’s Eyes” (Chapman) – 1:41
"The Big Bang Boom” – 3:01
"The Moon” (Chapman, Alvey) – 2:42
"Little Big Song” – 3:19
"Rockin’ Little Neutron Song” – 2:05
"Zodiacal Zydeco” – 3:10
"Test, Retest and Verify” (Chapman, Alvey) – 3:00
"The Way We Lean” – 2:08
"You Can See the Blues” (Alvey) – 3:33
"There Is No Darkness” (Chapman, Alvey) – 2:59

Personnel 

2012 albums
Beth Nielsen Chapman albums